Wolfgang Franz may refer to:
 Wolfgang Franz (economist)
 Wolfgang Franz (mathematician)